The 1961 Allan Cup was the Canadian senior ice hockey championship for the 1960–61 senior "A" season.  The event was hosted by the Galt Terriers and Galt, Ontario.  The 1961 playoff marked the 53rd time that the Allan Cup has been awarded.

Teams
Galt Terriers (Eastern Canadian Champions)
Winnipeg Maroons (Western Canadian Champions)

Playdowns

Allan Cup Best-of-Seven Series
Galt Terriers 4 - Winnipeg Maroons 3 (2OT)
Galt Terriers 3 - Winnipeg Maroons 2
Winnipeg Maroons 2 - Galt Terriers 1
Galt Terriers 4 - Winnipeg Maroons 2
Galt Terriers 5 - Winnipeg Maroons 0

Eastern Playdowns
Quarter-final
Granby Victorias defeated Hull Canadiens 3-games-to-none
Granby Victorias 2 - Hull Canadiens 1
Granby Victorias 5 - Hull Canadiens 3
Granby Victorias 4 - Hull Canadiens 1
Semi-final
Galt Terriers defeated Rouyn-Noranda Alouettes 3-games-to-none
Galt Terriers 4 - Rouyn-Noranda Alouettes 2
Galt Terriers 5 - Rouyn-Noranda Alouettes 3
Galt Terriers 4 - Rouyn-Noranda Alouettes 3
Amherst Ramblers defeated Granby Victorias 3-games-to-1
Amherst Ramblers 5 - Granby Victorias 3
Granby Victorias 5 - Amherst Ramblers 3
Amherst Ramblers 2 - Granby Victorias 0
Amherst Ramblers 5 - Granby Victorias 1
Final
Galt Terriers defeated Amherst Ramblers 4-games-to-none
Galt Terriers 5 - Amherst Ramblers 4
Galt Terriers 5 - Amherst Ramblers 0
Galt Terriers 4 - Amherst Ramblers 2
Galt Terriers 3 - Amherst Ramblers 2

Western Playdowns
Quarter-final
Winnipeg Maroons defeated Port Arthur Bearcats 3-games-to-2
Port Arthur Bearcats 4 - Winnipeg Maroons 0
Winnipeg Maroons 3 - Port Arthur Bearcats 2
Port Arthur Bearcats 5 - Winnipeg Maroons 3
Winnipeg Maroons 8 - Port Arthur Bearcats 6
Winnipeg Maroons 4 - Port Arthur Bearcats 0
Semi-final
Winnipeg Maroons defeated Moose Jaw Pla-Mors 3-games-to-1
Winnipeg Maroons 3 - Moose Jaw Pla-Mors 2
Winnipeg Maroons 5 - Moose Jaw Pla-Mors 3
Moose Jaw Pla-Mors 5 - Winnipeg Maroons 2
Winnipeg Maroons 3 - Moose Jaw Pla-Mors 1
Final
Winnipeg Maroons defeated Nelson Maple Leafs 4-games-to-2
Winnipeg Maroons 7 - Nelson Maple Leafs 2
Nelson Maple Leafs 4 - Winnipeg Maroons 3
Winnipeg Maroons 5 - Nelson Maple Leafs 3
Nelson Maple Leafs 3 - Winnipeg Maroons 2
Winnipeg Maroons 4 - Nelson Maple Leafs 0
Winnipeg Maroons 6 - Nelson Maple Leafs 1

References
Ottawa Citizen - 12 Apr 1961
Ottawa Citizen - 19 Apr 1961

External links
Allan Cup archives 
Allan Cup website

Allan Cup
Allan